Linda Melanie Villumsen Serup (born 9 April 1985) is a Danish-born road racing cyclist, who last rode for UCI Women's Team . Villumsen became a New Zealand citizen in 2009 and has ridden under a Kiwi licence from 2010.

Career
Born in Herning, Villumsen won the European under 23 time trial championship in 2006 and 2007.

She was Danish national champion in both road racing and time trialing in 2006, 2008 and 2009.  In 2006, Cycling World named her their Cyclist of the Year.

At the 2008 Summer Olympics in Beijing she finished 5th in the women's road race and 13th in the time trial.

At the 2012 Summer Olympics in London she finished 18th in the road race and fourth in the time trial, missing out on a medal by less than two seconds.

Villumsen won the Route de France Féminine in 2006 and 2013.

From 2008 to 2014 she placed 10th, 3rd, 3rd, 2nd, 3rd, 2nd and 9th in world championships time trials.

From 2012 to 2014 she placed 7th, 6th and 8th in world championships road races.

At the 2014 Commonwealth Games she won the gold medal in the road time trial and placed 5th in the road race.

In September 2015 Villumsen won the individual time trial at the UCI Road World Championships in Richmond, Virginia. Afterwards, her trade team, almost dropped her for riding her team issue New Zealand frame instead of her normal Wilier Cento Time Trial bike. The NZ team's bike, with its altered geometry, meant she could get much lower.

Villumsen is the only New Zealand senior cyclist to win an individual medal at the UCI Road World Championships.

Major results

2005
 1st Alblasserdam
 Danish National Road Championships
2nd Road race
3rd Time trial
 2nd Overall Damesronde van Drenthe
 2nd New Zealand World Cup

2006
 1st  Time trial, UEC European Under-23 Road Championships
 Danish National Road Championships
1st  Time trial
1st  Road race
 1st  Overall La Route de France
 1st Omloop der Kempen
 1st Mountains classification Damesronde van Drenthe
 2nd Overall Ster Zeeuwsche Eilanden
1st Stage 1 (ITT)
 2nd L'Heure d'Or Féminine
 3rd Individual pursuit, Danish National Track Championships
 9th Overall Holland Ladies Tour
1st  Young rider classification

2007
 1st  Time trial, UEC European Under-23 Road Championships
 1st Stage 6 Tour de l'Aude Cycliste Féminin
 3rd Overall Holland Ladies Tour
 5th Overall Emakumeen Bira
 10th Overall Giro d'Italia Femminile

2008
 Danish National Road Championships
1st  Time trial
1st  Road race
 1st Stage 1 (TTT) Giro della Toscana Int. Femminile – Memorial Michela Fanini
 2nd Open de Suède Vårgårda TTT
 5th Road race, Olympic Games
 8th Overall Iurreta-Emakumeen Bira
 9th Overall Tour de l'Aude Cycliste Féminin
 10th Time trial, UCI Road World Championships

2009
 Danish National Road Championships
1st  Time trial
1st  Road race
 1st  Overall Thüringen Rundfahrt der Frauen
1st Stage 3
 1st Trofeo Costa Etrusca – GP Comuni Santa Luce – Castellina Marittima
 2nd Open de Suède Vårgårda TTT
 3rd  Time trial, UCI Road World Championships
 3rd Overall Ster Zeeuwsche Eilanden
1st Stage 1 (ITT)
 7th Overall Holland Ladies Tour
 8th Overall Gracia–Orlová
 8th Tour de Berne
 10th Overall Tour de l'Aude Cycliste Féminin
1st Prologue

2010
 2nd  Time trial, Commonwealth Games
 New Zealand National Road Championships
2nd Road race
3rd Time trial
 2nd Chrono Gatineau
 2nd Open de Suède Vårgårda TTT
 3rd  Time trial, UCI Road World Championships
 5th Grand Prix Cycliste de Gatineau
 6th Overall Women's Tour of New Zealand

2011
 2nd  Time trial, UCI Road World Championships
 2nd Open de Suède Vårgårda TTT
 4th Overall Thüringen Rundfahrt der Frauen
 9th GP Ciudad de Valladolid

2012
 1st  Overall Giro del Trentino Alto Adige-Südtirol
1st Stage 2b (ITT)
 1st Stage 3 (ITT) Emakumeen Euskal Bira
 UCI Road World Championships
2nd  Team time trial
3rd  Time trial
7th Road race
 2nd Open de Suède Vårgårda TTT
 3rd La Flèche Wallonne Féminine
 3rd GP Stad Roeselare
 4th Time trial, Olympic Games
 5th Overall Grand Prix Elsy Jacobs
 7th Overall Women's Tour of New Zealand
1st Stage 5
 8th Overall Holland Ladies Tour
 10th Open de Suède Vårgårda

2013
 1st  Time trial, New Zealand National Road Championships
 1st  Overall La Route de France
1st Stage 7
 UCI Road World Championships
2nd  Time trial
6th Road race
 5th Overall Thüringen Rundfahrt der Frauen
1st  Active rider classification
 8th Overall Tour Cycliste Féminin International de l'Ardèche
1st  Mountains classification
1st  Combination classification
1st Prologue

2014
 Commonwealth Games
1st  Time trial
5th Road race
 1st  Overall Tour Cycliste Féminin International de l'Ardèche
1st Stage 2 (ITT)
 New Zealand National Road Championships
2nd Time trial
2nd Road race
 8th La Flèche Wallonne Féminine 
 UCI Road World Championships
8th Road race
9th Time trial

2015
 1st  Time trial, UCI Road World Championships
 New Zealand National Road Championships
1st  Road race
2nd Time trial
 5th Overall Tour of the Gila
 7th Overall Joe Martin Stage Race

2016
 1st Le Race
 2nd Overall Joe Martin Stage Race
1st Prologue
 5th Overall Tour of the Gila
 6th Time trial, Olympic Games

2017
 5th Overall Holland Ladies Tour
 6th Time trial, UCI Road World Championships

2018
 2nd Time trial, Commonwealth Games
 10th Overall Women's Herald Sun Tour

References

External links

1985 births
Living people
Danish female cyclists
New Zealand female cyclists
Danish emigrants to New Zealand
Olympic cyclists of Denmark
Cyclists at the 2008 Summer Olympics
Cyclists at the 2010 Commonwealth Games
Commonwealth Games gold medallists for New Zealand
Commonwealth Games silver medallists for New Zealand
Cyclists at the 2012 Summer Olympics
Cyclists at the 2016 Summer Olympics
Olympic cyclists of New Zealand
People from Herning Municipality
Cyclists at the 2014 Commonwealth Games
Commonwealth Games medallists in cycling
Lesbian sportswomen
LGBT cyclists
Danish LGBT sportspeople
New Zealand LGBT sportspeople
Danish lesbians
New Zealand lesbians
Sportspeople from the Central Denmark Region
Danish people of New Zealand descent
Medallists at the 2010 Commonwealth Games
Medallists at the 2014 Commonwealth Games